Jacky Trevane is the pseudonym of Jennifer Anne, a British woman who ran away from her Egyptian husband in 1992. With the help of ghostwriter Clifford Thurlow she published the book Fatwa: Living with a Death Threat, describing her version of her life with her Egyptian Muslim husband Maged (in her book called Omar). Jacky was twenty-three when she arrived in Egypt for a holiday with her boyfriend, Dave. Separated from Dave in a bustling street, she fell and twisted her ankle, only to be swept up by a young handsome, chivalrous Egyptian. It was, she says in her book, love at first sight. She married him, converted to Islam and lived with him in a poor suburb of Cairo. The couple bore two daughters. Their marriage, however, turned sour and Jennifer decided to return to England. She says a fatwa was issued against her and is thus "living in the shadow of a death threat." The Egyptian publication Al-Fajr spoke with Jennifer's husband, providing a different story and denying many of the claims Jennifer made.
After many women read Fatwa they contacted Jacky Trevane and told her their own stories which resulted in a book, Invisible Women: Living in Secrecy to Survive, published in 2005. In this book she shares eight of the stories told to her by different women.

References

External links 
 Jacky Trevane - En god muslimsk hustru 

British writers
Converts to Islam
Living people
Year of birth missing (living people)